The Ecuadorian horned frog (Ceratophrys testudo) is a species of frog in the family Ceratophryidae.
It is endemic to Ecuador.
Its natural habitats are subtropical or tropical moist montane forest and intermittent freshwater marshes.

References

Ceratophrys
Horned Frog, Ecuadorian
Endemic fauna of Ecuador
Amphibians described in 1945
Taxonomy articles created by Polbot